Dragoš Kalajić (22 February 1943 – 22 July 2005) was a Serbian painter, philosopher and writer.

Early life and education
Dragoš Kalajić was born on 22 February 1943 in Belgrade. Dragoš's father Velimir Kalajić was a Chetnik military judge, his mother Tatjana Kalajić (née Parenta) taught mathematics at the Faculty of Mining and Geology, University of Belgrade.

Kalajić studied art at the Accademia di Belle Arti in Rome. He graduated in 1966 with the highest marks in his class. After completing his training he began living and working in Belgrade and Rome.

Career
Kalajić was an accomplished writer beside being an artist (he wrote for the magazine Pogledi). He was a member of the Association of Writers of Serbia, the Association of Fine Artists of Serbia and the Association of Writers of Russia. He achieved considerable success in the many fields that he ventured into, from literature to visual arts to the history of art and publishing.

During the 1950's and 60's, Kalajić was part of the art group Mediala. During this time, he was notorious for his right-wing views in the vein of Julius Evola. In 1962, Kalajić played the character of Boba in Jovan Živanović's film Strange Girl.

During the rule of Slobodan Milošević, Kalajić published a column in the pro-government biweekly Duga. His views during that time have been described as "openly fascist" and anti-Semitic.

He considered himself a pagan.

Exhibitions

Solo exhibitions
 Galleria d'arte L'Obelisco, Rome (1964)
 Galleria del Levante, Rome (1967)
 Galerie Maya, Brussels (1967)
 Galerija suvremene umjetnosti, Zagreb (1968)
 Galleria Vinciano, Milan (1970)
 Museum of Contemporary Art, Belgrade (1973)
 Galerija Sebastian, Belgrade (1987)

Concept development for exhibitions
 Dimenzija realnog (A Dimension of the Real), Galerija Doma omladine, Belgrade (1967)
 Surovost kao ideal (Brutality as an Ideal), Galerija Ateljea 212, Belgrade (1967)
 Obnova slike (Renewal of the Image), Galerija Kulturnog centra Beograda, Belgrade (1971)
 Nova figuracija (New Figuration), Cvijeta Zuzorić Art Pavilion, Belgrade (1991)
 Beogradski pogled na svet (A Belgrade View of the World), Cvijeta Zuzorić Art Pavilion, Belgrade (1991)

References

External links 
 

1943 births
2005 deaths
Writers from Belgrade
Serbian fascists
Serbian journalists
Serbian philosophers
20th-century Serbian philosophers
21st-century Serbian philosophers
Serbian expatriates in Italy
20th-century Serbian painters
21st-century Serbian painters
21st-century Serbian male artists
Deaths from esophageal cancer
Deaths from cancer in Serbia
Serbian modern pagans
Modern pagan artists
20th-century journalists
Serbian male painters
20th-century Serbian male artists